The Shire of Wondai was a local government area located in the South Burnett region of Queensland, Australia, about  northwest of the capital, Brisbane.

Major activities in the shire include beef and timber.

History
Initially part of the Barambah Division which was proclaimed in 1879, Wondai became part of the Kilkivan Division when it split away from Barambah in 1888. With the formation of the Wondai Farmers Progress Association in 1905, pressure for the area to have its own shire council resulted ultimately in the creation of the Shire of Wienholt on 1 January 1910. In 1914, the Shire of Wienholt was renamed the Shire of Wondai.

On 15 March 2008, under the Local Government (Reform Implementation) Act 2007 passed by the Parliament of Queensland on 10 August 2007, the Shire of Wondai merged with the Shires of Kingaroy, Murgon and Nanango to form the South Burnett Region.

Towns and localities
The Shire of Wondai included the following settlements:

 Wondai
 Boondooma
 Durong
 Ficks Crossing
 Hivesville
 Mondure
 Proston
 Tingoora
 Wheatlands

Chairmen
 1927: P. Campbell

Population

References

Wondai
2008 disestablishments in Australia
Populated places disestablished in 2008